Nancy Creek may refer to:
Nancy Creek (Atlanta)
Nancy Creek (Cartersville), Georgia
Nancy Creek (Washington)
Nancy Creek (Montana)
Nances Creek, Alabama

See also
Nancy Town Creek, Banks County, Georgia 
Nancy Long Creek, Douglas County, Georgia
Nancy Branch, stream in Arkansas
Nancy Hanks Creek, South Dakota